Manolache may refer to several entities in Romania:

Manolache, a village in Glina Commune, Ilfov County
Odaia Manolache, a village in Vânători Commune, Galați County
Valea Manolache River
Manolache Costache Epureanu (1823-1880), politician
Cicerone Manolache (1936-), footballer
Ionela Târlea (1976-), formerly Ionela Târlea-Manolache, track and field athlete

Romanian-language surnames